For information on all Lamar University sports, see Lamar Cardinals and Lady Cardinals

The 2015–16 Lamar Cardinals basketball team represented Lamar University during the 2015–16 NCAA Division I men's basketball season.  The Cardinals were led by second year head coach Tic Price. The team played their home games at the Montagne Center in Beaumont, Texas and are members of the Southland Conference.  The Cardinals finished the season with a record of 11–19, 3–15 to finish in last place in conference. As a result, they failed to qualify for the Southland tournament.

Previous season

The Cardinals were picked to finish 10th in the conference in both the Coaches' Poll and the Sports Information Director polls. The Cardinals finished the season 15–15, 9–9 in Southland play to finish in sixth place. Due to APR penalties, the Cardinals were not eligible for postseason play, including the Southland tournament.

Preseason 
The Cardinals were picked to finish fifth (5th) in the conference in the Coaches' Poll and sixth (6th) in the Sports Information Director polls.

Roster

Media
All 2015 Lamar Cardinals home games except those otherwise contracted for through were broadcast online live by Big Red Sports Network (BRSN).  Starting January 4, 2016 all home games except for the January 11, 2016 game will be broadcast on ESPN3.  The January 11 game will be broadcast on the ASN.

Schedule and results

Season Results:

|-
!colspan=12 style="" | Out of Conference

|-
!colspan=12 style="" | Conference Games

See also
2015–16 Lamar Lady Cardinals basketball team

References

Lamar Cardinals basketball seasons
Lamar
Lamar Cardinals basketball
Lamar Cardinals basketball